Yanaqucha (Quechua yana black, qaqa rock, "black rock", also spelled Yanaccocha) is a mountain at a small lake of that name in the eastern extensions of the Cordillera Blanca in the Andes of Peru which reaches a height of approximately . It is located in the Ancash Region, Huari Province, San Marcos District.

References 

Mountains of Peru
Mountains of Ancash Region
Lakes of Peru
Lakes of Ancash Region